One More Saturday Night may refer to:

 "One More Saturday Night" (song), a song by the Grateful Dead
 One More Saturday Night (film), a comedy written by and starring Al Franken and Tom Davis
 One More Saturday Night, an album by Sha Na Na
 "One More Saturday Night", a song by Nils Lofgren from Nils Lofgren
 "One More Saturday Night", a single by Maureen Steele
 One More Saturday Night, a satellite radio show hosted by Bill Walton

See also
 "Another Saturday Night", a song by Sam Cooke
 Saturday Night (disambiguation)